Walter Harrison Blodgett (November 2, 1850 – January 6, 1923) was an American politician who served as the 33rd Mayor of Worcester, Massachusetts from 1904 to 1905.

Life and career
Walter H. Blodgett was born in Denmark, Lewis County, New York on November 2, 1850. He was the youngest of six children and spent his early life in Denmark, until moving to Worcester in 1881, opening a wholesale produce store.

In 1903, Blodgett was elected mayor of Worcester, winning by a significant margin. 

Blodgett died in Worcester on January 6, 1923, and was buried in Ogdensburg Cemetery in Ogdensburg, New York.

References

1850 births
1923 deaths
Mayors of Worcester, Massachusetts
People from Lewis County, New York
Massachusetts Republicans